Rasul Salimov (born December 26, 1981 in Dzhaba, Dagestan, USSR) is an Dagestani judoka, of Lezgin heritage.

Achievements

References
 

1981 births
Living people
Azerbaijani male judoka
Judoka at the 2000 Summer Olympics
Olympic judoka of Azerbaijan
21st-century Azerbaijani people
20th-century Azerbaijani people